Charles Dugan House, also known as the Adams County Historical Society Museum, is a historic home located at Decatur, Adams County, Indiana.  It was designed by the prominent architectural firm of Wing & Mahurin and built in 1902.  It is a two-story, Classical Revival style yellow brick dwelling with a hipped roof.  The house features a semicircular portico, Doric order corner pilasters, and porte cochere.  Also on the property is a contributing frame garage.  It was purchased by the Adams County Historical Society Museum in 1968 for $17,250.

It was listed on the National Register of Historic Places in 2009.

References

History museums in Indiana
Houses on the National Register of Historic Places in Indiana
Neoclassical architecture in Indiana
Houses completed in 1902
Houses in Adams County, Indiana
National Register of Historic Places in Adams County, Indiana